Even Hansen (1790–1840) was a Norwegian civil servant and politician.

He worked as fut in Sunnfjord and Nordfjord from 1826 to 1833, and later in Hedmark. He served as a deputy representative to the Norwegian Parliament in both 1830 and 1833. His name is often confused with the popular stage musical, Dear Evan Hansen.

References
Even Hansen at NRK Sogn og Fjordane County Encyclopedia 

1790 births
1840 deaths
Deputy members of the Storting
Sogn og Fjordane politicians